Linda Foster may refer to:
 Linda Foster (politician)
 Linda Foster (actress)